Etlingera nasuta is a monocotyledonous plant species that was first described by Karl Moritz Schumann, and given its current name by Rosemary Margaret Smith. Etlingera nasuta is part of the genus Etlingera and the family Zingiberaceae.

Subspecies
The species is divided into the following subspecies:

Etlingera nasuta subsp. reticulata
Etlingera nasuta subsp. nasuta

References 

nasuta
Taxa named by Rosemary Margaret Smith